Leslie Francis Fridge (born 27 August 1968) is a Scottish former football goalkeeper. He was formerly manager at Nairn County.

Career

A product of the Scottish Highland Football League, Fridge began his senior career with his home town club, Inverness Thistle of the Scottish Highland Football League, and as a 16-year-old played for Inverness Thistle, in goal, in the 1984-85 Scottish Cup against Celtic in a Fourth Round tie at Celtic Park in a 6-0 defeat.

He transferred early in his senior career, to Chelsea in April 1985. He played regularly for the Juniors in 1985-86. A goalkeeper with a good physique, he made his first-team debut for Chelsea in the last game of the 1985-86 season at home to Watford. Chelsea lost 5–1. This game was his first and his last game for Chelsea.

He  returned to Scotland and spent six years with St Mirren, including loans to Stirling Albion and Arbroath before having spells with Clyde and Raith Rovers. This was followed by a season playing for Dundalk in Ireland.

After much travelling Fridge soon returned home to sign for Inverness Caledonian Thistle. He spent four years with Caley but struggled to be regular choice at the Caledonian Stadium with the likes of Jim Calder and Nicky Walker to contend with. In 2002, he signed for near neighbours Ross County.

Fridge retired in 2003, and in 2004 became manager of nearby Nairn County of the Highland Football League. After twelve years and 477 games as manager, he left the club in 2016. He was also briefly a coach for Caley Thistle's youth teams.

References

External links
Les Fridge | History of Dundalk F.C.

1968 births
Scottish footballers
Chelsea F.C. players
St Mirren F.C. players
Stirling Albion F.C. players
Arbroath F.C. players
Clyde F.C. players
Raith Rovers F.C. players
Dundalk F.C. players
League of Ireland players
Inverness Caledonian Thistle F.C. players
Ross County F.C. players
Scottish Football League players
Scottish football managers
Living people
Association football goalkeepers
English Football League players
Scotland under-21 international footballers